Chang Yuchun (1330 – 9 August 1369), courtesy name Boren and art name Yanheng, was a Chinese military general of the Ming dynasty. He was a follower of Zhu Yuanzhang, the founding emperor of the Ming dynasty, and contributed heavily to the establishment of the Ming Empire. He was famous for his bravery and formidable prowess in battle, which earned him the nickname of "Chang Hundred-Thousand", because he alone was said to be as effective as a force of 100,000 troops.

Biography 

Chang was born in Huaiyuan County, Anhui, he was described as a stalwart man with imposing look and great strength. Chang joined the Red Turban Rebellion in 1355 to overthrow the Mongol-ruled Yuan dynasty in China. In the sixth month of that year, he followed Zhu Yuanzhang on a battle with the Yuan army that took place at Caishi (near present-day southern Ma'anshan, eastern bank of the Yangtze River). The rebel forces emerged victorious in that battle and Chang became famous. He was subsequently promoted to the rank of yuanshuai (equivalent of marshal).

Chang participated in major battles against Zhu Yuanzhang's rivals, Chen Youliang and Zhang Shicheng, helped Zhu eliminate them and secure his rule over China and laid the foundation for the Ming dynasty. He was granted the title "Duke of E" by Zhu in 1366. In 1367, Chang followed Xu Da on a military campaign north and conquered the Yuan capital, Khanbaliq, in the following year, thereby ending Mongol rule in China.

In 1369, Chang died of illness on the return journey to Nanjing in the east of present-day Xuanhua County, Hebei. When Zhu Yuanzhang heard of Chang's death, he wrote a poem mourning Chang and posthumously granted Chang the title "Prince of Kaiping" and the posthumous name "Zhongwu". Chang Yuchun had three sons, Chang Mao, Chang Sheng and Chang Sen.

In fiction 

Chang appears as a minor character in Louis Cha's wuxia novel The Heaven Sword and Dragon Saber. In the novel, he is a member of the Ming Cult, a rebel movement seeking to overthrow the Yuan dynasty. He is wounded in a fight with some Yuan soldiers but is saved by Zhang Sanfeng. He agrees to bring Zhang Wuji (the protagonist) with him to Butterfly Valley to seek treatment from the eccentric physician, Hu Qingniu. Several years later, Chang becomes Zhang Wuji's subordinate after Zhang becomes the cult's leader for his heroics in saving the cult from destruction. He participates in various battles against Yuan forces and eventually helps Zhu Yuanzhang establish the Ming dynasty.

Martial arts 
Chang Yuchun is said to be the creator of the martial art "Kaiping spear method".

Discourse on Chang Yuchun's religion and ethnicity 
Chang's religion and ethnic background is a controversial issue in Chinese historian circles. According to Bai Shouyi, Fu Tongxian, Jin Jitang, Ma Yiyu and Qiu Shusen (all Hui people except Qiu), Chang was from the Hui ethnic group. Tan Ta Sen and Dru C. Gladney also identified him as Hui or Muslim. Wen Yong-ning argued that Chang might not be Hui, based on Chang's family traditions and offspring and the status of the Semu in the Yuan dynasty. In a later paper, Li Jianbiao mentioned that Wen's work was speculative and not convincing.

See also 
 Tomb of Chang Yuchun

Notes

References 

14th-century Chinese people
Ming dynasty generals
14th-century Chinese military personnel
1330 births
1369 deaths
People from Bengbu
Generals from Anhui